The 1934 Princeton Tigers football team represented Princeton University in the 1934 college football season. The Tigers finished with a 7–1 record and outscored their opponents by a combined total of 280 to 38.  Their sole loss was to Yale by a 7–0 score. No Princeton players were selected as first-team honorees on the 1934 College Football All-America Team.

Schedule

References

Princeton
Princeton Tigers football seasons
Princeton Tigers footballl